Hussein Fakhry Pasha (1843-1920) was the Prime Minister of Egypt for three days during the Khedivate of Egypt. He was Prime Minister from January 15, 1893 to January 18, 1893. He had previously served as a cabinet minister.  He was Minister of Public Works during the building of the Aswan Low Dam and was appointed an Honorary Knight Commander of the Order of St Michael and St George in December 1902.

Personal life
He was of Turkish origin. His son, Mahmoud Fakhry, served as the minister of finance and minister of foreign affairs during the 1920s.

References

1843 births
1920 deaths
19th-century prime ministers of Egypt
Egyptian people of Turkish descent
Prime Ministers of Egypt
Egyptian pashas
Honorary Knights Commander of the Order of St Michael and St George
Irrigation Ministers of Egypt
Politicians awarded knighthoods